Reformism is a political doctrine advocating the reform of an existing system or institution instead of its abolition and replacement.

Within the socialist movement, reformism is the view that gradual changes through existing institutions can eventually lead to fundamental changes in a society's political and economic systems. Reformism as a political tendency and hypothesis of social change grew out of opposition to revolutionary socialism, which contends that revolutionary upheaval is a necessary precondition for the structural changes necessary to transform a capitalist system to a qualitatively different socialist system. Responding to a pejorative conception of reformism as non-transformational, non-reformist reform was conceived to prioritize human needs over capitalist needs.

As a doctrine, centre-left reformism is distinguished from centre-right or pragmatic reform, which instead aims to safeguard and permeate the status quo by preventing fundamental structural changes to it whereas leftist reformism posits that an accumulation of reforms can eventually lead to the emergence of entirely different economic and political systems than those of present-day capitalism and bureaucracy.

Overview 
There are two types of reformism. One has no intention of bringing about socialism or fundamental economic change to society and is used to oppose such structural changes. The other is based on the assumption that while reforms are not socialist in themselves, they can help rally supporters to the cause of revolution by popularizing the cause of socialism to the working class.

The debate on the ability of social democratic reformism to lead to a socialist transformation of society is over a century old. Reformism is criticized for being paradoxical as it seeks to overcome the existing economic system of capitalism while trying to improve the conditions of capitalism, thereby making it appear more tolerable to society. According to Rosa Luxemburg, capitalism is not overthrown, "but is on the contrary strengthened by the development of social reforms". In a similar vein, Stan Parker of the Socialist Party of Great Britain argues that reforms are a diversion of energy for socialists and are limited because they must adhere to the logic of capitalism.

French social theorist Andre Gorz criticized reformism by advocating a third alternative to reformism and social revolution that he called "non-reformist reforms", specifically focused on structural changes to capitalism as opposed to reforms to improve living conditions within capitalism or to prop it up through economic interventions.

In modern times, some reformists are seen as centre-right. For example, the historical Reform Party of Canada advocated structural changes to government to counter what they believed was the disenfranchisement of Western Canadians. Some social democratic parties such as the aforementioned Social Democratic Party of Germany and the Canadian New Democratic Party are still considered to be reformist and are seen as centre-left.

Socialism 

None of the initial figures that founded modern socialism in the early 19th century, such as the utopian socialists Henri de Saint-Simon, Charles Fourier, and Robert Owen were revolutionary. Instead these thinkers believed they could convince the governments and ruling classes in England and France to adopt their schemes through persuasion.
In 1875, the Social Democratic Party of Germany (SPD) adopted a Gotha Program that proposed "every lawful means" on a way to a "socialist society" and was criticized by Karl Marx, who considered the communist revolution a required step. One of the delegates to the SPD congress was Eduard Bernstein, who later expanded on the concept, proposing what he termed "evolutionary socialism". Bernstein was a leading social democrat in Germany. His "revisionism" was quickly targeted by revolutionary socialists, with Rosa Luxemburg condemning Bernstein's evolutionary socialism in her 1900 essay Social Reform or Revolution?; Bernstein's revisionism was also criticized by Orthodox Marxists such as Karl Kautsky, who condemned its theories in his 1909 work Road to Power.

While Luxemburg died in the German Revolution, the reformists soon found themselves contending with the Bolsheviks and their satellite communist parties for the support of intellectuals and the working class. In 1959, the Godesberg Program (signed at a party convention in Bad Godesberg in the West German capital of Bonn) marked the shift of the SPD from an orthodox Marxist program espousing an end to the capitalist system to a reformist one focused on social reform.

After Joseph Stalin consolidated power in the Soviet Union, the Comintern launched a campaign against the reformist movement by denouncing them as social fascists. According to The God that Failed by Arthur Koestler, a former member of the Communist Party of Germany, the largest communist party in Western Europe in the interwar period, communists aligned with the Soviet Union continued to consider the SPD to be the real enemy in Germany even after the Nazi Party had gotten into power.

The term was applied to elements within the British Labour Party in the 1950s and subsequently on the party's liberal-wing. Anthony Crosland wrote The Future of Socialism (1956) as a personal manifesto arguing for a reformulation of the term. For Crosland, the relevance of nationalization, or public ownership, for socialists was much reduced as a consequence of contemporary full employment, Keynesian management of the economy and reduced capitalist exploitation. After the third successive defeat of his party in the 1959 general election, Hugh Gaitskell attempted to reformulate the original wording of Clause IV in the party's constitution, but proved unsuccessful. Some of the younger followers of Gaitskell, principally Roy Jenkins, Bill Rodgers and Shirley Williams, left the Labour Party in 1981 to found the Social Democratic Party, but the central objective of the Gaitskellites was eventually achieved by Tony Blair in his successful attempt to rewrite Clause IV in 1995. The use of the term is distinguished from the gradualism associated with Fabianism (the ideology of the Fabian Society) which itself should not be seen as being in parallel with the Marxist reformism associated with Bernstein and the SPD as initially the Fabians had explicitly rejected orthodox Marxism.

See also 

 Centrist Marxism
 Communitarianism
 Democratic socialism
 Ethical socialism
 Fabian Society
 Impossibilism
 Incrementalism
 Iranian Reformists
 Libertarian possibilism
 Opportunism
 Passive revolution
 Radicalism
 Possibilism (politics)
 Post-capitalism
 Reform movement
 Revolutionary socialism
 Revisionism
 Social change
 Social democracy
 Social liberalism

References

External links 
 Luxemburg, Rosa (1900). Reform or Revolution?
 

Progressive conservatism
Democratic socialism
Liberalism
Liberal socialism
Marxism
Marxist theory
Reform
Social democracy
Reformism